Swimming was contested at the 1970 Asian Games in National Stadium, Bangkok, Thailand from December 12 to December 16, 1970.

Medalists

Men

Women

Medal table

References
 Sports 123: Asian Games
 Medallists

External links
 Asian Swimming Federation

 
1970 Asian Games events
1970
Asian Games
1970 Asian Games